St Wenefrede's Church is in Bickley, Cheshire, England.  The church is recorded in the National Heritage List for England as a designated Grade II listed building, and is an active Anglican parish church in the diocese of Chester, the archdeaconry of Chester, and the deanery of Malpas.

History

The church was built in 1892 and designed by the Chester firm of Douglas and Fordham for the 4th Marquess of Cholmondeley.

Architecture

The church is built in sandstone and has a roof of green slates with terracotta roof tiles. Its plan consists of a broad, low, west tower, a south porch against the tower, a three-bay nave with a narrow north passage-aisle, a chancel, and two north vestries.  The tower is in two stages with a splay-footed octagonal spire.  It has a three-light west window and three-light bell-openings in the stage above.  Inside the church is a hammerbeam roof.  There are texts on the roof beam, the pulpit and the organ case.  In the church are two stained glass windows designed by J. E. Nuttgens.

See also

Listed buildings in Bickley, Cheshire
List of new churches by John Douglas

References

Further reading

Bickley, St Wenefrede's Church
Bickley, St Wenefrede's Church
Churches completed in 1892
19th-century Church of England church buildings
Gothic Revival church buildings in England
Bickley, St Wenefrede's Church
Bickley, St Wenefrede's Church
Bickley, St Wenefrede's Church